Élie Lacoste (18 September 1745 in Montignac – 26 November 1806 in Montignac) was a French politician during the French Revolution.

He became the administrator of the newly created Dordogne department in 1790.  He was a deputy of the Legislative Assembly in 1791, he later went to the National Convention for the Dordogne department in 1793, he voted for the death of King Louis XVI in his trial and took part in missions in Lot and Dordogne departments and enlisted 300,000 men to the Nord and Pas-de-Calais departments for the Armée du Nord.  He attacked Maximilien de Robespierre on 9 thermidor, year II (27 July 1794) and demanded the arrest of Georges Couthon and Louis Antoine Léon de Saint-Just without accusing members of the Commune of Paris.

References

Sources
Histoire et dictionnaire de la Révolution française 1789-1799, Jean Tulard, Jean-François Fayard, Alfred Fierro

1745 births
1806 deaths
Deputies to the French National Convention
People from Dordogne
Presidents of the National Convention